Organizational storytelling (also known as business storytelling) is a concept in management and organization studies. It recognises the special place of narration in human communication, making narration "the foundation of discursive thought and the possibility of acting in common." This follows the narrative paradigm, a view of human communication based on the conception of persons as homo narrans.

Business organisations explicitly value "hard" knowledge that can be classified, categorized, calculated, analyzed, etc., practical know-how (explicit and tacit) and know-who (social connections). In contrast, storytelling employs ancient means of passing wisdom and culture through informal stories and anecdotes. The narrative is said to be more "synthetic" than "analytic", and help to: share norms and values, develop trust and commitment, share tacit knowledge, facilitate unlearning, and generate emotional connections.  Storytelling is an ingredient to make an idea "stick".

While storytelling is a key ingredient in great advertising, organizational storytelling caters to a very different audience. It deals with human beings in organizations connecting, engaging and inspiring other stakeholders using stories and story structures in their communication.

Perspectives 
Giroux and Marroquin distinguish five perspectives in writings on organizational storytelling:

The functionalist perspective sees storytelling as a management tool. It considers a top-down communication (for example, the communication of a boss to his employees), and aims at the efficiency of the transmission. As such, the narration must be brief and consistent with objectives.
 However, strategic ambiguity is sometimes not a bug, but a feature.

The interpretative perspective considers the organization as a subjective universe that the researcher can only grasp through the representations that the actors summon in their narrations. The narratives then bear both the central values and culture of the organization and the differences, conflicts and contradictions. Thus, officially promoted values are confronted with those that emerge from the narratives. There have been attempts to develop institutional interpretative devices by combining insights from anthropology, literary theory and institutionalism, for example. Antenarrative
 tries to link retrospective narrative to a living story.

The process perspective, following the work of Karl E. Weick, considers the organization not as a fixed entity but as an organising process that emphasises the interactions and co-construction. The researchers then study the narratives in situations of organizational change, controversy or deliberation. This perspective postulates that actors demonstrate a narrative intelligence, which refers to their "ability to produce and understand stories".

The critical perspective emphasizes the asymmetrical relationships within organizations. The narration can be used to "create a culture of submission". The critical feminist prospective focuses on gender differences, revealing how they are created, nurtured, conveyed and challenged by narratives.

The postmodern perspective, which is the most recent and controversial, sees society and organization as fragmented. It places textuality at the center of the researcher's approach, and promotes the polyphony of speech. The researcher becomes a narrator by giving a voice to marginalized employees.

See also
 Metanarrative
 Narratology

References

Further reading
 Boje, David M. 1989 "Postlog: Bringing performance back in",Journal of Organizational Change Management, 2(2): 80–93  
 Boje, David M. 1991. "The storytelling organization: A study of storytelling performance in an office supply firm". Administrative Science Quarterly, 36: 106–126.
 Brown, J.S., Denning, S., Groh, K., Prusak, L. 2004. Storytelling in Organizations: Why Storytelling Is Transforming 21st Century Organizations and Management. Boston: Butterworth Heinemann. 
 Czarniawska, Barbara. 1998. A Narrative Approach to Organization Studies. Qualitative Research methods Series Vol. 43. Thousand Oaks, Ca; Sage Publications, Inc.
 Czarniawska, Barbara. 2004. Narratives in Social Science Research. London: Sage.
 Denning, Steve. 2000. The Springboard: How Storytelling Ignites Action in Knowledge-Era Organizations. Boston: Butterworth Heinemann.
 Denning, Steve. 2004. Squirrel Inc.: A Fable of Leadership Through Storytelling. San Francisco: Jossey–Bass.
 Denning, Steve. 2004. “Telling Tales”, Harvard Business Review, May 2004.
 Denning, Steve. 2005. The Leader's Guide to Storytelling: Mastering the Art & Discipline of Business Narrative, Jossey–Bass, San Francisco
 Denning, Steve. 2007. The Secret Language of Leadership: How Leaders Inspire Action Through Narrative, Jossey–Bass, San Francisco 
 Dolan, G. 2016. "Storytelling for Job Interviews". Vivid Publishing.
 Dolan, G. 2007. "From the tea room to the board room", Anthill Magazine.
 Gabriel, Yiannis. 1991. "On organizational stories and myths: Why it is easier to slay a dragon than to kill a myth." International Sociology 6:427–442.
 Gabriel, Yiannis.1995. "The unmanaged organization: Stories, fantasies and subjectivity." Organization Studies 16:477–501.
 Gabriel, Yiannis 2000. Storytelling in Organizations: Facts, fictions, and fantasies. London: Oxford University Press. 
 Gargiulo, Terrence L. 2001. Making Stories: A Practical Guide for Organizational Leaders and Human Resource Specialists Westport: Greenwood 2007. Once Upon a Time: Using Story-Based Activities to Develop Breakthrough Communication Skills, Jossey Bass/Pfeiffer, San Francisco 2006. Stories at Work: Using Stories to Improve Communication and Build Relationships, Connecticut: Praeger
 Gargiulo, Terrence L. 2005. The Strategic Use of Stories in Organizational Communication and Learning, Armonk, NY: M.E. Sharpe.
 Kelley, T. 2005. The Ten Faces of Innovation. NY: Random House.
 Kouzes, J.M & Posner, B.Z.: 2003. The Leadership Challenge. San Francisco: Jossey–Bass.
 Laufer, A. and Hoffman, E., Project Management Success Stories: Lessons of Project Leaders, John Wiley & Sons, 2000.
 Pink, D. 2006. A Whole New Mind: Why Right-Brainers Will Rule the Future. Riverhead Trade.
 Signorelli, J. 2011, "StoryBranding: Creating Standout Brands Through the Power of Story, Greenleaf Books
 Simmons, A. 2002 The Story Factor, Basic Books, New York.
 Sykes, Malik, West. 2012, Stories That Move Mountains, John Wiley & Sons, UK
 Zemke, Ron (1990) Storytelling: Back to basics. Training, March : 44–49.

Organizational behavior
Storytelling